Battle 360°, also written as Battle 360, is an American documentary television series that originally aired from February 29 to May 2, 2008 on History. The program focuses on the World War II-era aircraft carrier . The show was produced by Flight 33 Productions.

Battle 360° makes extensive use of computer animation to depict the story of Enterprise.  The animation is combined with documentary footage, interviews of Enterprise crew members and military historians, and voice-over narration.

The series was written by Tony Long and Samuel K. Dolan, and produced by Brian Thompson, Samuel K. Dolan and Tim Evans. It is narrated by Wally Kurth. Military historians providing commentary included Alan Pietruszewski, First Sergeant William Bodette, Martin K. A. Morgan, Jonathan Parshall, and producer and story editor Samuel K. Dolan. The 3D graphics are by Crazybridge Studios, with additional graphics by Radical 3D; the visual effects supervisor is Steffen Schlachtenhaufen. The executive producers were Louis C. Tarantino and Douglas J. Cohen, and the associate producer was Ryan Hurst.

On February 29, 2008, the first episode of Battle 360° had 1.8 million viewers. At the time, that was the second highest viewer total for a History channel series premiere, behind Ice Road Truckers.

The series original run was broadcast with limited commercial interruptions because of its sponsorship by Enterprise Rent-A-Car, whose founder, Jack Taylor, served on Enterprise as a fighter pilot during World War II.

Patton 360°, a spin-off series of Battle 360°, premiered on April 10, 2009 on the same channel.

Veterans 
Each episode of Battle 360 makes extensive use of veteran interviews from the sailors, pilots and Marines of USS Enterprise (CV-6). Many of these veterans' accounts appear as ongoing storylines throughout the series and the veterans themselves become regular characters. Among the veterans interviewed for the program are pilots Captain Donald "Flash" Gordon, Stanley "Swede" Vejtasa, Captain Norman "Dusty" Kleiss, Rear Admiral James D. Ramage, and Bruce McGraw. Among the ship's surviving crew interviewed for the series are Yeoman Willard Norberg, Roy E. Blood (1918–2015), Jack Glass, Arnold Olson and James Barnhill. Members of the ship's Marine Detachment are also interviewed including Louis Michot, Jack Maroney, Frank Graves, Richard Harte, Walter Keil and George E. Lanvermeier, Sr.

Episodes

The series consists of ten episodes.

Broadcast airings
Repeats of the series are currently airing on the digital broadcast network Quest. The show has also been rereleased on the Official YouTube Channel.

References

External links
 Battle 360° official website
 Flight 33 Productions
 

2000s American documentary television series
2008 American television series debuts
2008 American television series endings
Documentary television series about aviation
Documentary television series about World War II
History (American TV channel) original programming